My Book is the debut solo album of K-Ci Hailey of Jodeci as well as K-Ci & JoJo. One single was released off the album called "It's All Love" featuring KansasCali.

Reception

Commercial performance 
My Book peaked at number 57 on the US Top R&B/Hip-Hop Albums in 2006 (Billboard Albums).

Track listing 
"My Book (Prelude)"
"My Book"
"It's All Love" (featuring KansasCali)
"Conversation (Can I Talk 2 U)"
"Thug by Heart" (featuring Layzie Bone)
"Ghetto Woman"
"Woman's Gotta Have It"
"I Apologize"
"Much Too Soon" (featuring Al B. Sure! & Aaron Hall)
"What Else Can I Do"
"Limousine"
"Baby I'm Back"
"Soldier"
"Cheating on Us"
"You"
"Care for You"
"It's Alright"
"It's All Love" [Kazzu Remix] (featuring KansasCali, bonus track)
"Conversation" [Dance Remix] (bonus track)

Charts

References

External links 

2006 debut albums